Fugui railway station is a railway station located in Hengshan, Hsinchu County, Taiwan. It is located on the Neiwan line and is operated by the Taiwan Railways Administration.

The station was formerly known as Nanhe railway station, but TRA changed its name in 2003 to pair it with Ronghua railway station in order to make the tickets between the two stations auspicious. When put together, the station names spell out the phrase "wealth and honor". The move faced controversy from residents of Nanhe Village.

References

Railway stations opened in 1962
Railway stations in Hsinchu County
Railway stations served by Taiwan Railways Administration